Mobile Suit Gundam: Try Age,  is a card-based real-time strategy arcade game based on the Gundam. Released by Bandai in July 2011.

Series Featured
 Mobile Suit Gundam
 Mobile Suit Gundam: The 08th MS Team
 Mobile Suit Gundam 0083: Stardust Memory
 Mobile Suit Zeta Gundam
 Mobile Suit Gundam ZZ
 Mobile Suit Gundam: Char's Counterattack
 Mobile Suit Gundam 0080: War in the Pocket
 Mobile Suit Gundam 00
 Mobile Suit Gundam SEED
 Mobile Suit Gundam Unicorn
 Mobile Suit Gundam AGE
 Mobile Fighter G Gundam
 Mobile Suit Gundam Wing

See also
 Mobile Suit Gundam AGE
 Gundam

References

Exterminal link 
 オフィシャルサイト 

2011 video games
Bandai games
Gundam video games
Real-time strategy video games
Arcade video games
Arcade-only video games
Video games developed in Japan